Eighteen Hour Stopover (French: Dix-huit heures d'escale) is a 1955 French crime film directed by René Jolivet and starring Jean-Pierre Aumont, Geneviève Kervine and Georges Marchal. The film's sets were designed by the art director Robert Hubert.

Cast
 Jean-Pierre Aumont as Robert Vitrac
 Geneviève Kervine as Nicole Dumaine
 Georges Marchal as L'inspecteur Bério
 Maria Mauban as Manuela Cortez
 Georges Poujouly as Le gamin avec le capitaine
 Jean-Jacques Lécot as 	Mario
 Henri San Juan as Pablo Gonzales	
 Jany Vallières as Lolita
 Luc Andrieux as Le barman
 Jacques Muller as Aurélien
 Guy Moulinet as Zamba
 Paul Faivre as Le docteur
 Noëlle Norman as Mme. Bério
 Gaston Rey as Berger

References

Bibliography 
 Rège, Philippe. Encyclopedia of French Film Directors, Volume 1. Scarecrow Press, 2009.

External links 
 

1955 films
1955 crime films
French crime films
1950s French-language films
Films directed by René Jolivet
French black-and-white films
1950s French films